Manuel Corpas (born December 3, 1982) is a Panamanian professional baseball pitcher for the Martinez Sturgeon of the Pecos League. He previously played in Major League Baseball (MLB) for the Colorado Rockies and Chicago Cubs.

Career

Colorado Rockies
From the town of Aguas Benditas-Chilibre, Panama, Corpas was signed by the Colorado Rockies at the age of 16 as an amateur free agent in 1999. He made his debut for the Rockies on July 18, 2006.
Following the All-Star Break in 2007, Corpas filled in as closer for Brian Fuentes, who was demoted after taking four of eight losses during an 8-game losing skid. Corpas finished the year with a 4–2 win–loss record, a 2.08 earned run average, and 19 saves in 22 chances; he continued to serve as the Rockies' closer during the 2007 postseason.

He continued as the closer into the  season. However, after a number of poor outings, he was replaced by Fuentes in late April. In 2008, he tied for the major league lead in blown saves, with 9.

During 2009 spring training, he competed with Huston Street for the closer spot; Street won the position and Corpas started the season as the eighth inning set up pitcher. After poor performances by Street, Corpas was renamed the closer on April 17; however, Corpas also pitched poorly, and the closer job was given back to Street on May 1.

Texas Rangers
Following the 2010 season, Corpas was released. On April 8, 2011, Corpas signed a minor league contract with the Texas Rangers.

Chicago Cubs
After missing the entire 2011 season due to Tommy John surgery, Corpas signed a one-year deal with the Chicago Cubs on December 22, 2011.

After being outrighted off of the Cubs' 40-man roster, Corpas elected free agency. Corpas had a 5.01 ERA and  innings in 48 games.

Second stint with the Colorado Rockies
On January 9, 2013, Corpas signed a minor league contract with the Rockies. His contract was purchased from Colorado Springs (PCL) on June 2, 2013. He was outrighted off the roster and elected free agency October 17, 2013. Corpas rejoined the Rockies for the 2014 season, agreeing to a minor league contract. On July 13, 2014, Corpas was released by the Rockies.

Diablos Rojos del México
On April 2, 2015, Corpas signed with the Diablos Rojos del México of the Mexican Baseball League.

Guerreros de Oaxaca
On July 15, 2015, Corpas was traded to the Guerreros de Oaxaca of the Mexican Baseball League. He was released on February 17, 2016.

York Revolution
Corpas signed with the York Revolution of the Atlantic League of Professional Baseball for the 2016 season. He became a free agent after the 2016 season. He resigned on May 13, 2017, but was released on June 16, 2017.

Sugar Land Skeeters
That same day he signed with the Sugar Land Skeeters of the Atlantic League of Professional Baseball. He became a free agent after the 2017 season.

Algodoneros de Unión Laguna
On May 1, 2018, Corpas signed with the Algodoneros de Unión Laguna of the Mexican Baseball League. He became a free agent after the season.

Milwaukee Milkmen
On August 14, 2019, Corpas signed with the Milwaukee Milkmen of the American Association. He was released on January 16, 2020. 

On January 12, 2021, Corpas announced his retirement from professional baseball.

West Virginia Power
On June 26, 2021, Corpas came out of retirement to sign with the West Virginia Power of the Atlantic League of Professional Baseball. Corpas struggled to a 1–2 record and 13.00 ERA in 4 starts with the team before being released on July 19.

Martinez Sturgeon
On February 23, 2022, Corpas signed with the Martinez Sturgeon of the Pecos League as both a player and their field manager.

International career
He was selected Panama national baseball team at the 2006 World Baseball Classic, 2009 World Baseball Classic,
2013 World Baseball Classic Qualification, 2017 World Baseball Classic Qualification and 2019 Pan American Games Qualifier.

References

External links

, or Retrosheet, or Pura Pelota

1982 births
Algodoneros de Unión Laguna players
Asheville Tourists players
Bravos de Margarita players
Casper Rockies players
Chicago Cubs players
Colorado Rockies players
Colorado Springs Sky Sox players
Diablos Rojos del México players
Guerreros de Oaxaca players
Iowa Cubs players
Leones del Caracas players
Panamanian expatriate baseball players in Venezuela
Leones del Escogido players
Panamanian expatriate baseball players in the Dominican Republic
Living people
Major League Baseball pitchers
Major League Baseball players from Panama
Mexican League baseball pitchers
Milwaukee Milkmen players
Panamanian expatriate baseball players in Mexico
Panamanian expatriate baseball players in the United States
Modesto Nuts players
Sportspeople from Panama City
Sugar Land Skeeters players
Tri-City Dust Devils players
Tulsa Drillers players
Venados de Mazatlán players
York Revolution players
2006 World Baseball Classic players
2009 World Baseball Classic players
Criollos de Caguas players
Panamanian expatriate baseball players in Puerto Rico
Expatriate baseball players in Nicaragua